The 2007 Conference USA men's soccer tournament was the thirteenth edition of the Conference USA Men's Soccer Tournament. The tournament decided the Conference USA champion and guaranteed representative into the 2007 NCAA Division I Men's Soccer Championship. The tournament was hosted by the University of Alabama at Birmingham and the games were played at West Campus Field.

Bracket

Schedule

Quarterfinals

Semifinals

Final

Statistics

Goalscorers

Awards

All-Tournament team
 Steven Cabas, FIU
 Ainsley Deer, FIU
 Juan Guerra, FIU
 Sterling Flunder, Marshall
 Jeff Lenix, Marshall
 Mike Lindsay, South Carolina
 Mark Wiltse, South Carolina
 Eric Burkholder, Tulsa
 Dominic Cervi, Tulsa
 Chris Clements, Tulsa
 Eric DeFreitas, Tulsa

References

External links
 

Conference USA Men's Soccer Tournament
Tournament
Conference USA Men's Soccer Tournament
Conference USA Men's Soccer Tournament